Omar Mohamed Gamal Kamel (born 16 September 1982) is an Egyptian former professional footballer who played as an attacking midfielder.

References

External links
 
 

1982 births
Living people
People from Minya Governorate
Egyptian footballers
Association football midfielders
Al Aluminium SC players
Ismaily SC players
Al-Ahly SC (Benghazi) players
Zamalek SC players
Al Mokawloon Al Arab SC players
Ceramica Cleopatra FC players
Egyptian Second Division players
Egyptian Premier League players
Libyan Premier League players
Egypt international footballers
2008 Africa Cup of Nations players
Egyptian expatriate footballers
Egyptian expatriate sportspeople in Libya
Expatriate footballers in Libya